The Gugu Rarmul were an indigenous Australian people of the state of Queensland, one of several whose speech was called Gugu Yawa ('Possum language').

Country
According to Norman Tindale, the Kokojawa had  of territory. They lived southeast of the Morehead River down to Laura. Due south their boundary was on the south to
North Palmer River and the Great Dividing Range. They were present at the upper Mossman and Kennedy rivers.

Alternative names
 Djauan.
 Kokorarmul,
 Jouon.
 AkuRarmul.
 Bindaga. (generic term for both the Kokojawa and several other tribes south of Princess Charlotte Bay).

Notes

Citations

Sources

Aboriginal peoples of Queensland
Far North Queensland